Blueberry River may refer to:

Blueberry River (Minnesota)
Blueberry River (British Columbia)
Blueberry River Indian Reserve No. 205, British Columbia
the Blaeberry River in British Columbia is sometimes referred to as the Blueberry River

See also 
 Blueberry (disambiguation)